Trasierra is a municipality located in the province of Badajoz, Extremadura, Spain. According to the 2014 census, the municipality has a population of 659 inhabitants.

Local celebrations
Fiesta del Santísimo Cristo del Socorro or Fiesta de los Manoletes, 20 April.
San Isidro Labrador, 15 May
San Antonio de Padua, 13 June
Fiestas Patronales. Santa Marta, 29 July.
Fiesta de La Chaquetía, 1 November.

References

External links

Municipalities in the Province of Badajoz